Seconds from Disaster is a US/UK-produced documentary television programme that investigates historically relevant man-made and natural disasters from the 20th and early 21st centuries. Each episode aims to explain a single incident by analyzing the causes and circumstances that ultimately effected  the disaster. The program uses re-enactments, interviews, testimonies, and CGI to analyze the sequence of events second-by-second for the audience.

Seconds from Disaster was first broadcast on the National Geographic channel in 2004 and originally consisted of 45 episodes over three seasons. Following its original conclusion in 2007, the show was put on a four-year hiatus and later replaced with Critical Situation. In 2011, National Geographic revived the show and aired another 22 episodes over three seasons until the following year. In 2018, the show revived again and aired two episodes featuring compilations about helicopter and airliner crashes. Narrators of the show are Ashton Smith, Richard Vaughan, and Peter Guinness.

Format
Seconds from Disaster is characterised by an emphasis on chronological sequencing (in accordance with the show's name), the use of CGI technology and its blueprint-like CGI format. The show has little or no dialogue for the actors in the re-enactments, but instead is almost entirely dominated by the narrator.

Each episode begins with a chronological re-enactment of the disaster, which is always cut into several scenes displaying critical moments in the unfolding of the disaster with a clock appearing at the beginning of each scene. After the sequence of events, the show "winds back" the scenes to analyse the causes and events leading up to the disaster. The series uses blueprint-formatted CGI in every episode to reveal the anatomy of the disaster and the structures involved but in season 3, the blue formatting of the CGI is not used on the background and is replaced with a white background. From season 4 onwards, they used a sepia-like background. The show concludes with the original disaster scenes being rewound and played again; but this time, the clock is being replaced by a countdown timer and the conclusions reached from the analysis being put together with the sequence. Most often, the show finishes with a short moment of sentimentality (where those involved often speak of their emotions on the disaster) followed by the technological advances made to prevent similar disasters from happening again.

Episodes

See also
 Blueprint for Disaster
 Critical Situation
 Mayday (Canadian TV series)
 Seismic Seconds
 Trapped (National Geographic Channel)
 Zero Hour (2004 TV series)

References

External links
 
 

2000s American documentary television series
2004 American television series debuts
2010s American documentary television series
American television series revived after cancellation
Documentary films about disasters
National Geographic (American TV channel) original programming
Seven Network original programming